The Royal Moroccan Air Force is the air force of the Moroccan Armed Forces.

History
The Moroccan air force was formed on 14 May 1956 as the Sherifian Royal Aviation.

Its modern installations and bases were inherited from France (Meknes, Rabat in tandem with the United States, Marrakech, Kenitra, Ben Guerir, Boulhault, Nouasseur, and Sidi Slimane), and later Spain (Laayoune). In the 1950s and 1960s, American aircraft were deployed in several of these bases, including nuclear bombers from the Strategic Air Command.

The first aircraft of this newly formed air force were 16 Morane-Saulnier Alcyons, five Max Holste MH.1521 Broussard transport aircraft, one Aérospatiale Alouette II, and one Bell H-13 Sioux.

In 1961, it obtained 12 Mikoyan-Gurevich MiG-17 fighters, two Mikoyan-Gurevich MiG-15UTI trainers and either two or four Ilyushin Il-28 bombers from the Soviet Union. Eight Fouga Magister training aircraft were also received from France.

On 1 February 1964, the Sherifian Royal Aviation changed its name to Royal Air Force.

The political rift with the Soviet Union pushed Morocco to seek a new ally in the United States, acquiring from the latter six Northrop F-5 combat aircraft (4 single-seat F-5A and 2 two-seat F-5B) and another 20 F-5A and four F-5B in 1966. Around 1962, 10 Douglas C-47 Skytrain and six Fairchild C-119G transport aircraft were acquired. At that time, the helicopter fleet was composed of six Aerospatiale Alouette IIs and four Bell 47s. 12 North American T-6 Texans were used for pilot training; no less than eight T-6Gs and 56 SNJ-4s had been delivered by France, but most of them were in a very poor condition, and written off soon after their delivery. 15 Harvard Mk 4s were also delivered in 1962.

Starting in 1968, Morocco acquired 60 AB205, 25 AB206, two AB212, and nine CH-47C helicopters from Italy. Deliveries lasted until 1977.

The next modernization of the Moroccan Air Force took place just before the Sahara conflict. The first 25 Mirage F1CH fighters were purchased in 1975, together with 38 Aerospatiale Puma helicopters. Six C-130Hs were bought in 1973, and deliveries started in 1974. Modernization of Northrop F-5 Freedom Fighter with improved technology and the purchase of 24 Alpha Jet E would later be undertaken by the RMAF; another modernization of the fleet of Dassault Mirage F1 was achieved in 1996 and 1997.

During the 90s there were plans for purchasing Mirage 2000 or F-16 fighter aircraft, however due to unavailable funding they were not realized. By 2011 the Royal Moroccan Air Force started to modernize its ageing fleet by buying F-16s.

Operations

Sand War
The RMAF participated in the Moroccan-Algerian border conflict in 1963 known as Sand War. Its Fairchild C-119s and Douglas C-47s were used to resupply troops, North American T-6s for reconnaissance, and Morane-Saulnier Alcyons for ground attack. MiG-17s were only used sporadically, mostly due to their short range.

Yom Kippur War
During the Yom Kippur War, a squadron of Royal Moroccan Air Force Northrop F-5As joined the Egyptian 69 Squadron at Tanta on 19 October 1973. At least 14 MiG-17s and also around a dozen of F-5As were deployed. The F-5As arrived after a lengthy trip, via Tunis and Libya, accompanied by Lockheed C-130 Hercules transports that carried spare parts, weapons, and equipment. Moroccans started flying tasked with CAP missions over the Nile Delta. In January 1974 two F-5As armed with AIM-9Bs and 20mm cannons intercepted a pair of Israeli Air Force Mirage IIICJs on a reconnaissance mission. The Israelis turned away once the F-5As were detected, dragging both RMAF fighters behind them. Concerned about a possible ambush by Israeli F-4E Phantom IIs, the Egyptian Air Force ground control ordered both Moroccan fighters to return, replacing them with two EAF MiG-21MFs.

Western Sahara War
At the beginning of the Western Sahara War, Fouga Magisters (based at Laayoune) and North American T-6 Texans (based at Dakhla) were used for ground support. Later on, the F-5s went into action, to strike POLISARIO targets.

In 1980, construction of the Sahara defensive walls began, consisting of several types of obstacles for infantry and armoured vehicles, such as mine fields and barbed wire. Radars and other electronic sensors were used to detect infiltration attempts, all backed by Quick Intervention Units (Détachements d'Intervention Rapide) able to move to and quickly reinforce attacked outposts along the wall. It was also decided to use Aérospatiale SA 342 Gazelle helicopters with HOT missiles to engage the POLISARIO's armoured vehicles and technicals from outside the range of light anti-aircraft guns. Apart from the ground radars of the Wall, two C-130 Hercules equipped with SLARs were also used for the detection of enemy units. However, the first portion of the wall, completed in 1982, protected only the area considered as “useful” for Morocco's political and economic interests, that is, the capital Laayoune, the religious center Smara, and the phosphate fields of Bou Craa.

After the loss of nine F-5As during combat operations against the POLISARIO, 16 F-5Es and 4 F-5Fs were acquired in October 1979. The main problem that faced Moroccan fighter-bombers in Western Sahara was their insufficient range over the vast battlefield of the Sahara desert. To address it, in 1982, a Boeing 707-138B was fitted with Beech hose units at the wingtips for refueling. Two Lockheed KC-130Hs were also delivered, and all of the F-5Es were modified with aerial refueling probes.

In December 1977, the Royal Moroccan Air Force started receiving its first Mirage F1CHs. Even though the Mirage F1CH was designed as an interceptor, it was used almost exclusively for ground attack in the war against the POLISARIO. The last of a total of 30 Mirage F1CHs were received in December 1979. Additionally, 20 Mirage F1EHs (including six equipped with in-flight refuelling probes) were delivered between December 1979 and July 1982.

Together with the F-5E/Fs, the FRA decided to buy a total of 24 OV-10As from the United States Marine Corps. However, only the first six aircraft were delivered. They were mostly used in a maritime patrol role and for reconnaissance due to their inefficiency in combat.

Intervention against ISIL
In late 2014 Morocco sent F-16s into combat against ISIL in Iraq and Syria. This was the first deployment for the jets since Morocco purchased them in 2011.

Modernization in the 21st century
The Royal Moroccan Air Force started a progressive modernization program of its ageing fleet and their technical and operational capacities.

F-5 upgrades 
Improvements to F-5A/B were realised with the installation of "Tiger II" avionics on, probably, 8 F-5A and 2 F-5B. A contract was stipulated with the French company SOGERMA at Bordeaux (France), all aircraft were received by 1998. From 2001 to 2004 the RMAF's F-5E/F received a full refurbishment and upgrade from SOGERMA. The upgraded improved the performance of the "Tiger II" to the level of the "Tiger III". The work carried up included:
 new FIAR Grifo F/X Plus improved radar (similar in performance to the AN/APG-69)
 Elettronica ELT/555 active Electronic Countermeasures (ECM) pods.
 HOTAS (Hands On Throttle And Stick)
 New EWPS/-100 (DM/A-106) RWR
 Cockpit Layout with new:
 heads-up display
 Weapons Delivery and Navigation System MFD/WDNS
 Multifunction displays

The F-5E/F TIII acquired the capability to use new weapon systems such as Beyond Visual Range missiles and precise-guided weapons. RADA ACE ground debriefing station,  a Simulator and AN/AAQ-28(V) LITENING targeting pods have also been purchased.

Mirage F1 MF2000 ASTRAC 
In 2005, the RMAF started the 350 million euro MF2000 Dassault Mirage F1 upgrade program, which has overhauled 27 Mirage F1s (F1CH, F1EH and F1EH-200) to the level of Mirage 2000-5 to improve survivability for the MF2000, that included :
 The replacement of the old Thomson-CSF Cyrano IV radar by Thales RC400 (RDY-3).
 4% thrust boost and longer life through a new compressor module for the Snecma Atar 9K50 engines.
 New cockpit Layout with two multifuction LCDs, a Head-Up Display with UFCP (Up Front Control Panel), two mini-LCDs (to RWR and artificial horizon) and full HOTAS controls.
 Inertial-aided GPS Navigator Sagem Sigma 95.
 CN2H-AA Mk II Night-Vision Goggles.
 Modern zero-zero ejection seat.
 About 100 million euro worth of MICA missiles
 New electronics:
 New weapons management system.
 Advanced Thales Radar-warning system.
 New Data Link.
 Improved communications-system.
 Two Dynamic task computer-integrated with a MIL-STD-1553B bus.
The upgrade enabled the use of more advanced equipment as:
 Corail flare launchers.
 Phimat chaff dispensers.
 Electronic protection-Pod PAJ-FA ECM.
 Thales Damocles Pod.
 Capability to carry Advanced Air-to-air missiles, Air-to-ground missiles and guided-bombs :
 Armement Air-Sol Modulaire (AASM) GPS/INS and GPS/INS+IIR guided bombs.
 AM39 Exocet Air-to-sea missiles.
 Paveway Laser-guided bombs.

This upgrade was developed by ASTRAC (Association Sagem Thales pour la Rénovation d'Avions de Combat).

T-6C Texan and F-16C/D Block 52+ 
In 2007, Morocco formally requested 24 T-6C Texan trainer aircraft, with very secondary light attack capability.

In 2008, a $2.4 billion order was placed for 24 F-16C/D Block 52+ aircraft as well as associated equipment and services, with:
 F100-PW-229 Enhanced Engine Package (EEP) turbofan engines
 AN/APG-68V9 radars
 conformal fuel tanks (CFTs).

F-16 fleet improvements 
Later, from 2008 to 2012 the RMAF purchased advanced equipment for its F-16 fleet:
 Advanced countermeasures electronic systems (ACES).
 Joint Helmet Mounted Cueing Systems (JHMCS).
 AN/AVS-9 night vision goggles.
 AN/APX-113 Advanced Identification Friend or Foe (AIFF) Systems.
 AN/ALQ-187 Advanced Self-Protection Integrated Suites (ASPIS II).
 AN/ALR-93 radar warning receivers.
 DB-110 airborne reconnaissance pods.
 AN/AAQ-33 Sniper Advanced Targeting Pods (ATPs).

Advanced armament was also acquired:
 AIM-120 C7 Advanced Medium Range Air-to Air Missiles (AMRAAM).
 AIM-9M-9 and AIM-9X Block II Sidewinder short range air-to-air missiles.
 AGM-88B/C HARM Missiles.
 AGM-65D/G/H MAVERICK Missiles.
AGM-84L Harpoon Block II Missiles.
 GPS/INS and Laser-guided Joint Direct Attack Munition (JDAM) tail kits.
 GBU-24 Paveway III, GBU-10 Paveway II and GBU-12 Paveway II laser-guidance and fin kits to convert 2,000 pound bombs.

Possible F-35 acquisition

Morocco is reported to be interested of purchase F-35s to counter its arch-rival Algeria which is reported to have placed order for 14 Su-57s. Israeli defence intelligence firm, JaFaj announced in January that Israeli Minister of Defence, Benny Gantz said that his Moroccan counterpart Abdellatif Loudiyi, the Moroccan Minister of Defence, is asking for Israel's help to convince the Biden administration to authorize the sale of F-35 to Morocco.

Other purchases and upgrades 
In 2008, 4 C-27J Spartan tactical transport aircraft were also purchased from Finmeccanica subsidiary Alenia Aeronautica for 130 million euro, and the advanced trainer and CAS/COIN aircraft Alpha Jet E fleet was upgraded to the "E+ standard". General Atomics received in 2010 export licenses to sell an unarmed export version of the Predator to Saudi Arabia, Egypt, U.A.E. and Morocco. Six aerial firefighting Bombardier 415 Superscooper were also purchased in 2011. The modernization and upgrade of the former US Air Force base in Ben Guerir Air Base to support its F-16 Fighting Falcon aircraft is also important. In March 2013, it has been reported that the RMAF have purchased 3 EADS Harfang MALE UAVs decommissioned by France, but these would not have been delivered until 2020.

In 2015, 3 refurbished CH-47D were received from the US, to be added to the 9 CH-47C delivered in 1979 and 1982 (originally 12 were acquired).

In 2019, Government of Morocco requested purchase of 25 F-16 block 72 and was approved by The U.S. Department of State. A $2.8 billion contract was signed in 2020. First shipment of 12 new Vipers will be received in 2021.

It has been proposed to upgrade the existing F-16's to the Viper standard.

24 Apache helicopters were also ordered in 2020.

Accidents
In January 2011, a Royal Moroccan Air Force F-5 crashed while trying to land at the airport of the military base near Meknes and a pilot was killed in the crash.

In July 2011, a Royal Moroccan Air Force C-130H crash killed 78 people after the aircraft, en route from Dakhla, a city in Morocco to Kenitra Air Base in Kenitra, crashed  from a planned stop-over at Guelmim Air Base. The 6 crew, 60 members of the army and 12 civilians, mainly partners travelling with their partners, perished in the accident.

In November 2012, nine soldiers were killed and two seriously injured in a SA330 Puma crash in the same region of Guelmim during a combined forces exercise.

On May 11, 2015, a Royal Moroccan Air Force F-16 which was taking part in air campaign in Yemen crashed due to technical faults.

On 16 August 2015, a Mirage F1 was lost after a bird strike.

On 21 January 2019, a Mirage F1 has crashed in Taounat area due to a technical problem. The pilot ejected before the crash.

Ranks

Officers

 Général Suprême des Armées et Commandant en Chef: His Majesty the King of Morocco.

Enlisted

Airbases

 Salé BAFRA Nº 7 (Air Base)
 Meknes BAFRA Nº 6 (Air Base)
 Kenitra BAFRA Nº 3 (Air Base)
 Laayoun BAFRA Nº 4 (Air Base)
 Sidi Slimane BAFRA Nº 2 (Air Base)
 Ben Guerir BAFRA N°1 (Air Base)
 Oujda BAFRA N°0 (Air Bases Headquarter)
 Marrakech BEFRA  (Academy Air Base & Air Base)
 Rabat North Area Headquarters
 Agadir South Area Headquarters
 Casablanca Aeronaval Base
 Khouribga Annexe AeroBase

Aircraft

Current inventory

References

Citations

Bibliography

External links
 Order of Battle at Scramble.nl
 Moroccan air force fleet photos - airliners.net
 Moroccan air force losses - skywar.ru

 
Morocco
Air Force